Ernest (e) Allard (1820–1900) was a French entomologist who specialised in Coleoptera. He is not to be confused with the Belgian entomologist Vincent Allard (1921–1994).

Allard's collection was acquired  by René Oberthür and is now held by Muséum national d'histoire naturelle, in Paris and Museum Koenig in Bonn. He was a Member of the Société entomologique de France.

Works

Allard, E. 1869. Révision du genre Asida Latreille. L'Abeille, Revue d'Entomologie 6: 159–305.
Allard, E. 1876. Révision des hélopines vrais de Lacordaire, L'Abeille, Revue d'Entomologie 14: 1–80.

Further reading
Aubé C. 1863. [new taxa]. In: Grenier A. J. F.: Catalogue des coléoptères de France et matériaux pour servir à la faune des coléoptères français par MM. E. Allard, Ch. Aubé, Ch. Brisout de Barneville, A. Chevrolat, L. Fairmaire, A. Fauvel, A. Grenier, Dr Kraatz, J. Linder, L., Reiche et Félicien de Saulcy. L. Toinon, Paris: A. J. F. Grenier, iv + 3–79 + 1–135 pp.

References
Constantin, R. 1992: Memorial des Coléopteristes Français. Bulletin de liaison de l'Association des Coléoptéristes de la région parisienne, Paris (Suppl. 14), S. 1–92, pp. 8
Giard, A. 1900: [Biographien] Bulletin de la Société Entomologique de France, Paris 1900 , pp. 42

1820 births
1900 deaths
French entomologists